Söğüt District is a district of Bilecik Province of Turkey. Its seat is the town Söğüt. Its area is 523 km2, and its population is 18,352 (2021). It is in the Marmara region in the north-west of the country, bordering Bilecik to the west, Gölpazarı to the north, İnhisar to the north-east, Tepebaşı (Eskişehir) to the south-east, and Bozüyük to the south-west.

Composition
There is one municipality in Söğüt District:
 Söğüt

There are 23 villages in Söğüt District:

 Akçasu
 Borcak
 Çaltı
 Dereboyu
 Dömez
 Dudaş
 Geçitli
 Gündüzbey
 Hamitabat
 Hayriye
 Kayabalı
 Kepen
 Kızılsaray
 Küre
 Oluklu
 Ortaca
 Rızapaşa
 Savcıbey
 Sırhoca
 Tuzaklı
 Yakacık
 Yeşilyurt
 Zemzemiye

References

Districts of Bilecik Province